Dolera Davronova (born 3 November 2001) is an Uzbekistani weightlifter. She won the silver medal in the girls' +63 kg event at the 2018 Summer Youth Olympics held in Buenos Aires, Argentina. At the time, she won the bronze medal but Supatchanin Khamhaeng of Thailand was stripped of her gold medal after testing positive for a banned substance.

At the 2017 Asian Weightlifting Championships held in Ashgabat, Turkmenistan, she won the bronze medal in the women's 90 kg event. She also won the bronze medal in the women's 90 kg event at the 2017 Asian Indoor and Martial Arts Games held in Ashgabat, Turkmenistan. In 2018, she won the gold medal in the women's 90 kg event at the Junior World Weightlifting Championships held in Tashkent, Uzbekistan.

In April 2021, she competed at the 2020 Asian Weightlifting Championships held in Tashkent, Uzbekistan.

References

External links 
 

Living people
2001 births
Place of birth missing (living people)
Uzbekistani female weightlifters
Weightlifters at the 2018 Summer Youth Olympics
21st-century Uzbekistani women